Duke of Hernani (Spanish language: Duque de Hernani) is a Spanish noble title. It was created on 11 August 1914 by King Alfonso XIII of Spain and conferred upon his fourth cousin, Manfredo Luis de Borbón, 3rd Duke of Ansola, 2nd Marquis of Antarfe (1889–1979). They are both King Carlos III of Spain's great-great-great grandsons.

The 1st Duke of Hernani was Manfredo Luis de Borbón, a great-grandson of Infante Sebastian of Portugal and Spain. He died childless in 1979 and willed the dukedom to his relative, Infanta Margarita of Spain, granddaughter of King Alfonso XIII. Her brother, King Juan Carlos I of Spain, approved the succession and she inherited the dukedom.

Dukes of Hernani
1914-1979: Manfredo Luis de Borbón, 1st Duke of Hernani, 3rd Duke of Ansola
1979–present: Infanta Margarita of Spain, 2nd Duchess of Hernani, Duchess of Soria

The 2nd Duchess has a son and a daughter, who are entitled to inherit the dukedom.

 
Spanish noble titles